Shawn Patrick Crowley is an American diplomat.  He is current as Chargé d'Affaires to Italy since July 18, 2022.

Biography 
Crowley received a Bachelor's degree in international relations from Georgetown University and a Master's degree in national security strategy from the National War College. Before working for the State Department, he worked as a banker in the Cayman Islands and as a staffer in the German Parliament in Bonn.

In 1991 Crowley began his career in the foreign service, working in Kuwait on political issues such as repatriation of American prisoners from Iraq. He would go on to hold numerous other positions throughout the Middle East and Europe. Between January and March 2012, he led the U.S. diplomatic mission in Benghazi.

Crowley would later on serve as Chargé d'Affaires from the United States to the Netherlands from July 29, 2016, to January 4, 2018.

On May 16, 2020, Crowley began working for the Bureau of European and Eurasian Affairs. He has since moved up to the position of director of Western European Affairs, a position which he still holds.

Family 
Crowley and his wife Sabine have two grown children, a daughter working as a microbiologist in Arkansas and a son working in marketing in Frankfurt.

References 

20th-century births
Year of birth missing (living people)
20th-century American businesspeople
20th-century American diplomats
21st-century American businesspeople
 21st-century American diplomats
Ambassadors of the United States to the Netherlands
American bankers
American expatriates in the Cayman Islands
American expatriates in Germany
American expatriates in Italy 
American expatriates in Kuwait
American expatriates in Libya
Georgetown University alumni
Living people
National War College alumni
People from Benghazi
People from Bonn